Canada World Youth (CWY, in French: Jeunesse Canada Monde, JCM) was an international non-profit organization dedicated to providing youth with a voluntary opportunity to learn about other communities, cultures and people while developing leadership and communications skills.

Founded in 1971 by Jacques Hébert (1923–2007) a former Canadian senator and lifelong promoter of youth and international development programs, Canada World Youth has sent over 50,000 youth volunteers in 69 countries worldwide to participate in its programs. The organization is currently in the process of winding down operations.

Save CWY/JCM
Save Canada World Youth is a grassroots movement initiated by alumni of the Canada World Youth/Jeunesse Canada Monde (CWY/JCM) program, which is a non-profit organization that focuses on providing international volunteer and exchange opportunities for Canadian youth. The movement was formed in response to the Canadian government's decision to significantly cut funding for the CWY/JCM program in 2012. The alumni believe that the CWY program has had a significant impact on the lives of Canadian youth and the communities they serve around the world and that it is an important tool for promoting cross-cultural understanding and global citizenship. The Save Canada World Youth movement aims to raise awareness about the value of the CWY program and to encourage the Canadian government to reinstate funding to ensure its continued success. The movement has organized various campaigns, including a petition on Change.org, social media campaigns, and outreach to Canadian parliamentarians and decision-makers, to draw attention to the importance of the CWY program and the need to secure its future.

Former programs
 Women's Entrepreneur & Leadership Initiative
 EQWIP Hubs in partnership with YCI International Inc.
 Global Learner Programs
 Pathways to Indigenous Youth Leadership
 Mentorship Program
 Youth Leaders in Action
 Québec sans frontières
 CWY Student Network
 Youth Exchange Program

Partner countries since 1971

Antilles and America

Asia

Africa

Central and East Europe

Oceania
 Fiji

References

External links

Youth organizations based in Canada